Harry Chalmers (4 April 1920 – 26 August 1982) was  a former Australian rules footballer who played with North Melbourne and Footscray in the Victorian Football League (VFL).

Notes

External links 
		

1920 births
1982 deaths
Australian rules footballers from Victoria (Australia)
North Melbourne Football Club players
Western Bulldogs players